Buy & Cell is a 1988 comedy film directed by Robert Boris. The original music score was composed by Mark Shreeve.

Plot

Herbie Altman (Robert Carradine) is framed by his business partner and sent to jail where he sets up "Con Inc." an investment company with the help of those around him. This is due to the fact that he helped a fellow inmate to invest his money. He runs the business under the nose of the police wardens.

Principal cast
 Robert Carradine as Herbie Altman
 Randall "Tex" Cobb as Wolf
 Imogene Coca as Leah
 Mickey Knox as Arthur
 Malcolm McDowell as Warden Tennant
 Roddy Piper as Cowboy
 Ben Vereen as Shaka
 Michael Winslow as Sly
 Fred Travalena as 'VCR'

Availability
The movie was released on videocassette in 1989 by New World. The tape itself is notable for having trailers for the films Warlock and The Punisher, both of which were passed on to separate studios after New World fell into bankruptcy. In 1991, Starmaker Video released a tape in the EP Mode. A DVD has been released in Australia and in the Netherlands, but as of December 22, 2009, no plans for a Region 1 DVD have been announced.

Critical reception
From All Movie Guide:

References

External links 
 
 

1988 films
1980s crime comedy films
American business films
American crime comedy films
Empire International Pictures films
1980s English-language films
Films directed by Robert Boris
Films shot in Italy
American independent films
1980s prison films
Trading films
1980s business films
1988 independent films
1980s American films